Small ubiquitin-related modifier 1 is a protein that in humans is encoded by the SUMO1 gene.

Function 

This gene encodes a protein that is a member of the SUMO (small ubiquitin-like modifier) protein family. It is a ubiquitin-like protein and functions in a manner similar to ubiquitin in that it is bound to target proteins as part of a post-translational modification system. However, unlike ubiquitin, which is primarily associated with targeting proteins for proteasomal degradation, SUMO1 is involved in a variety of cellular processes, such as nuclear transport, transcriptional regulation, apoptosis, and protein stability. It is not active until the last four amino acids of the carboxy-terminus have been cleaved off. Several pseudogenes have been reported for this gene. Alternate transcriptional splice variants encoding different isoforms have been characterized.

Most cleft genes have a sumoylation component. Analysis of chromosomal anomalies in patients has led to the identification and confirmation of SUMO1 as a cleft lip and palate locus.

Interactions 
Small ubiquitin-related modifier 1 has been shown to interact with:

 C22orf25,
 DAXX, 
 DNMT3B, 
 P53, 
 PIAS1, 
 PML, 
 SAE2, 
 SP1, 
 TDG, 
 TNFRSF1A, 
 TNFRSF6, 
 TOP2A, 
 TOP2B, and
 UBE2I,

Role in the heart 
Heart failure is a process by which the heart’s pumping ability is significantly weakened, so that the body is unable to get adequate circulation. A weakened heart results in symptoms of fatigue, decreased exercise tolerance and shortness of breath.  Patients with heart failure have a significantly increased risk of death compared to people with normal heart function.  Heart failure is a major public health concern, as its incidence is on the rise worldwide, and is a leading cause of death in developed nations 

SUMO 1 is a key component in cardiac function, since it helps regulate calcium homeostasis in the mitochondria of heart cells.  SUMO 1 is associated with another essential cardiac protein called sarco/endoplasmic reticulum Ca2+ ATPase, or SERCA2A. SERCA is a transmembrane protein located in the sarcoplasmic reticulum of cardiac cells. Its main function is to regulate the discharge and uptake of intracellular calcium between the cytosol and the lumen of the sarcoplasmic reticulum. Calcium is an essential factor for the development of cardiac myocyte contraction and relaxation.  Thus, the management of intracellular calcium homeostasis by SERCA2A is critical for overall cardiac performance. Normally, SUMO 1 activates and stabilizes SERCA2A by binding at lysine resides 480 and 585. The interaction between SUMO 1 and SERCA2A is crucial for regulating calcium levels inside cardiac myocytes. Reduction in SUMO 1 protein reduces SERCA2A, and thus efficient calcium handling in patients with failing hearts.

As a drug target 
SUMO 1 may be an important therapeutic target to help improve cardiac performance in patients with heart failure. In a mouse model, the introduction of SUMO 1 through gene therapy was associated with improved activity of SERCA2A, which resulted in improved cardiac function through an augmentation of cardiac contractility.  Furthermore, overexpression of SUMO 1 resulted in accelerated calcium uptake, providing further evidence regarding its importance in maintaining adequate calcium levels in heart cells.

See also 
 SENP6

References

Further reading

External links